Alexander James Watt Hinshelwood (born ) is a former  international rugby union player.

He was capped twenty-one times for Scotland as a wing between 1966 and 1970. He scored five tries for Scotland.

Hinshelwood was selected for the 1966 British Lions tour to Australia and New Zealand and the 1968 British Lions tour to South Africa. He played in two tests against the All Blacks on the 1966 tour, scoring one try, and in one test, which was drawn, against  in 1968.

He played club rugby for London Scottish. His son, Ben Hinshelwood, is also a Scotland rugby union international.

References

1942 births
Living people
British & Irish Lions rugby union players from Scotland
London Scottish F.C. players
Middlesex County RFU players
Rugby union wings
Scotland international rugby union players
Scottish rugby union players
Stewart's Melville RFC players